"D" Is for Deadbeat is the fourth novel in Sue Grafton's "Alphabet" series of mystery novels and features Kinsey Millhone, a private eye based in Santa Teresa, California.  The novel follows the development of Kinsey's relationship with Jonah Robb, the police officer she met in B is for Burglar.

Plot summary
Kinsey Millhone receives a contract from ex-con Alvin Limardo to deliver a cashier's check for twenty-five thousand dollars to a fifteen-year-old boy named Tony Gahan. According to Limardo, Tony helped him through a tough time in his life, leaving Limardo indebted. However, when the retainer check Limardo made out to Kinsey for four hundred dollars bounces, she learns that Alvin Limardo is actually John Daggett, a man known by all and liked by few, and recently released from a local prison. He is also a bigamist. His first wife Essie's fanatical religious views have kept her married to Daggett, while Daggett, in disregard of his marital status, underwent a second marriage to Lovella on his release from prison, whom he has subjected to domestic abuse.

In her search to find Daggett and get her money back, Kinsey discovers that he was found dead on the beach only a few days after hiring her. Through Daggett's daughter Barbara, Kinsey learns that Tony Gahan was the sole survivor of a family killed in a car accident caused by Daggett, for which he received a conviction on charges of vehicular manslaughter. Tony's been a wreck since the death of his family, rarely sleeping and doing poorly in school. He now lives with his uncle and aunt, Ramona and Ferrin Westfall. Also killed in the accident was a friend of Tony's young sister, and a boy called Doug Polokowski, who had hitched a ride in the car. Kinsey tracks down an ex-con friend of Daggett's, Billy Polo, now living in a trailer park with his sister, Coral. Billy introduced Lovella to Daggett. Kinsey finds out that Doug Polokowski was Billy and Coral's brother. There's no shortage of people with a motive for Daggett's death, but the police are classifying it as an accident.

Kinsey discovers that shortly before his death, Daggett was staggering about drunk at the marina in the company of a blonde woman in a green outfit. Kinsey sets out to discover which of the numerous blonde women in the case might be the killer. She also suspects that Billy Polo is not giving her the full truth about his involvement with Daggett, a suspicion confirmed when Coral finally levels with Kinsey and reveals him to be blackmailing someone he suspects of Daggett's killing. The blackmailer murders Polo at the beach, using Kinsey's own gun, stolen from her car a few days earlier. Coral also admits to scheming with Billy and Lovella to rob Daggett of money he had come by illicitly in prison, not knowing that Daggett had given the money to Kinsey to pass on to Tony.

The police investigating Billy's murder discover a home-made silencer used in the killing. Kinsey immediately recognizes the toweling used for padding as coming from the Westfall household, and Ramona jumps to the top of her suspect list. This means confronting Tony, who has given Ramona an alibi for the time of Daggett's death. In pursuing Tony, Kinsey realises Tony himself, dressed as a woman in his aunt's wig, was actually the killer. He was also the one who stole her gun and killed Billy Polo, who had recognized Tony at Daggett's funeral. Killing the man who killed his family has done nothing to ease Tony's torment, however; and he commits suicide by throwing himself off a building in front of Kinsey, despite her best effort to talk him down.

Characters
Kinsey Millhone: Private detective who is hired by a man who gives her a retainer check, which then bounces.

Reviews
The novel received a positive review from Kirkus Reviews, which praised its plot, pace, poignancy, and realism.

Publishers Weekly gave a more mixed review, saying that it was an enjoyable read but finding flaws in its plot.

References

External links
Sue Grafton Alphabet Series official site

Novels by Sue Grafton
Kinsey Millhone novels
1987 American novels
Novels set in California
Henry Holt and Company books